Otto Holzapfel (born February 5, 1941 in Beeskow) is a German folklorist and researcher of traditional German folk song (folk music, Lied). He is a retired professor at the University of Freiburg. His mother tongue is Danish. He studied in Frankfurt am Main; among his subjects were Scandinavian languages and literature with Klaus von See. In 1970 he was appointed curator (archivist) at the German Folk Song Archives in Freiburg, now Center for Popular Culture and Music, University of Freiburg.  He led this institute until 1996. He was co-editor of the journal Jahrbuch für Volksliedforschung from 1984 to 1998 and editor of the Studien zur Volksliedforschung (volumes 1 – 17, 1991–1996). Special topics of Holzapfel are the traditional German folk ballad and the tradition of the German folk song, European mythology and German-Danish genealogy. He has edited several volumes of the standard edition of the traditional German folk ballads Deutsche Volkslieder mit ihren Melodien: Balladen (10 volumes, 1935–1996), and he created a system for analyzing German quatrains (Schnaderhüpfel, four line lyric stanzas, Gstanzl). Since 2006 he supervises the German song index (Liedverzeichnis')', now online.

 Partial list of publications 
 [with Julia McGrew and Iørn Piø, editors] The European Medieval Ballad: A Symposium. Odense, Denmark: University Press, 1978. 
 [with Flemming G. Andersen and Thomas Pettitt, editors] The Ballad as Narrative: Studies in the Ballad Traditions of England, Scotland, Germany and Denmark. Odense, Denmark: University Press, 1982. 
 „Graf und Nonne. An Analysis of the Epic-Formulaic Elements in a German Ballad“. In: Carol L. Edwards (editor): Narrative Folksong: New Directions. Boulder, CO 1985, p. 179–193. 
 Vierzeiler-Lexikon: Schnaderhüpfel, Gesätzle, Gestanzeln (Gstanzl), Rappeditzle, Neck-, Spott-, Tanzverse und verwandte Formen aus mündlicher Überlieferung (= Studien zur Volksliedforschung. 7–11). Volumes 1–5. Bern: Lang, 1991–1994. ISSN 0930-8636
 „Totenlieder deutscher Auswanderer in Kansas (USA)“. In: Jahrbuch für Volksliedforschung 31 (1986), p. 83–87.
  [with Philip V. Bohlman] The Folk Songs of Ashkenaz (= Recent Researches in the Oral Traditions of Music. 6). Middleton, WI 2001. 
  [with Philip V. Bohlman, editor] Land without Nightingales: Music in the Making of German-America. Madison, WI 2002. 
 „Singing from the Right Songbook: Ethnic Identity and Language Transformation in German American Hymnals“. In: Philip V. Bohlman (editor): Music in American Religious Experience. New York 2006, p. 175–194. 
 Liedverzeichnis: Die ältere deutschsprachige populäre Liedüberlieferung online on the German homepage of the „Volksmusikarchiv des Bezirks Oberbayern“; PDF-format; currently being updated). - Otto Holzapfel: Liedverzeichnis''. Volumes 1–2. Hildesheim: Olms, 2006.

References 

German folklorists
1941 births
Living people
Academic staff of the University of Freiburg
Goethe University Frankfurt alumni
Academic journal editors
People from Beeskow